The Governor of Zhytomyr Oblast is the head of executive branch for the Zhytomyr Oblast.

The office of Governor is an appointed position, with officeholders being appointed by the President of Ukraine, on recommendation from the Prime Minister of Ukraine, to serve a four-year term.

The official residence for the Governor is located in Zhytomyr. Since 8 August 2019 the Governor is Vitaliy Bunechko.

Governors
 Anton Malynovskyi (1992–1994, as the Presidential representative)
 Anton Malynovskyi (1995–1998, as the Governor)
 Volodymyr Lushkin (1998–2001)
 Mykola Rudchenko (2001–2004)
 Serhiy Ryzhuk (2004–2005)
 Pavlo Zhebrivskyi (2005)
 Iryna Synyavska (2005–2006)
 Volodymyr Zahryvyi (2006, acting) 
 Yuriy Andriychuk (2006)
 Volodymyr Zahryvyi (2006, acting)
 Yuriy Pavlenko (2006–2007, acting to 2007)
 Yuriy Zabela (2007–2010, acting to 2007)
 Serhiy Ryzhuk (2010–2014)
 Sydir Kizin (2014)
 Serhiy Mashkovskyi (2014–2016)
 Ihor Hundych (2016–2019, acting to 2016)
 Yaroslav Lahuta (2019, acting)
 Vitaliy Bunechko (2019–)

Notes

References

Sources
 World Statesmen.org

External links
Government of Zhytomyr Oblast  in Ukrainian

 
Zhytomyr Oblast